Lushlife is the third and final studio album by Bowery Electric. It was released on Beggars Banquet Records on February 22, 2000.

Reception
Andy Kellman of AllMusic gave the album 3 stars out of 5, commenting that "Lawrence Chandler's beats, though highly clichéd at points, land harder than before, and Martha Schwendener's vocals are more prominent." He called it their "most song-based" and "most accessible" work.

Marc Savlov of The Austin Chronicle gave the album 4 stars out of 5, describing it as "a morphine drip of an album, so clear and precise in its smokey, sexy grooves that it seems almost too easy to compare them to fellow late-night nodders Portishead." Sarah Zupko of PopMatters gave the album 6 stars out of 10, saying, "the tone herein is decidedly downcast and often forlorn."

Track listing

Personnel

Bowery Electric
 Lawrence Chandler – programming, sampling, scratching, bass guitar, guitar, keyboards, drums, string arrangement
 Martha Schwendener – vocals, bass guitar, guitar, keyboards, string arrangement

References

External links
 

2000 albums
Beggars Banquet Records albums
Bowery Electric albums